Ensemble (Victoriaville) 1988 is a live album by American composer and saxophonist Anthony Braxton recorded in 1988 and released on the Victo label.

Reception
The Allmusic review by Stephen Cook awarded the album 4½ stars calling it "A top-notch Braxton release".

Track listing
All compositions by Anthony Braxton
 "Composition No 141 (+20 + 96+120d)" - 40:46
 "Composition No 142" - 8:24
Recorded at the Festival International De Musique Actuelle in Victoriaville, Quebec (Canada) on October 8, 1988

Personnel
Anthony Braxton - sopranino saxophone, soprano saxophone, alto saxophone
Paul Smoker - trumpet
George Lewis - trombone
Evan Parker - tenor saxophone
Bobby Naughton - vibraphone
Joëlle Léandre - bass
Gerry Hemingway - percussion

References

Anthony Braxton live albums
1992 albums